Ardmair is a village in Wester Ross, in the North West Highlands of Scotland. It is a popular holiday resort, with a caravan site and  a number of holiday homes. During the holiday period, visitors can hire a boat from the beach at Ardmair, including canoe boats. The peak of Ben Mor Coigach is to the north, and is sometimes climbed by people staying in Ardmair.

Ardmair lies on the shores of Loch Kanaird. The River Kanaird flows into Loch Kanaird to the north of Ardmair Point; it rises in the hills to the north-east of Ullapool.

Offshore from Ardmair Bay lies Isle Martin, about a kilometre from Ardmair Point at its nearest point. This island is managed as a nature reserve, and was owned by the RSPB until 1999. On 3 May 1999 ownership of the island passed to a charitable trust formed by the local community, who agreed to assume responsibility for the island. The trust runs a passenger ferry running from Ardmair to Isle Martin on some days in the summer.

References

Populated places in Ross and Cromarty